This article contains information about the literary events and publications of 1903.

Events

January–December – Henry James's novel The Ambassadors is published as a serial in the monthly North American Review.
May 22 – Japanese philosophy student Misao Fujimura (藤村操, born 1886) carves a poem into a tree at Kegon Falls before committing suicide over unrequited love.
June 20 – Jack London's novel The Call of the Wild begins serial publication in the Saturday Evening Post.
October 24 – Mark Twain sets out for Florence (Italy).
December – The Prix Goncourt for French literature is awarded for the first time, to John Antoine Nau for his novel Force ennemie.
December 16 – The London County Council erects a plaque to novelist Charles Dickens (d. 1870) on his former home in Doughty Street.
December 19 – The first of G. K. Chesterton's short stories in the series The Club of Queer Trades, "The Tremendous Adventures of Major Brown", appears in Harper's Weekly.
unknown date – William Foyle and his brother Gilbert establish the London bookselling business of Foyles.

New books

Fiction
Pío Baroja – El Mayorazgo de Labraz (Lord of Labraz, second of La Tierra Vasca – The Basque Country trilogy, 1900–1909)
Ioan A. Bassarabescu – Nuvele
Thio Tjin Boen – Tjerita Oeij Se
René Boylesve – Enfant à la Balustrade
Samuel Butler (died 1902) – The Way of All Flesh
Erskine Childers – The Riddle of the Sands
Joseph Conrad – Typhoon and Other Stories (U. K. book publication)
Joseph Conrad and Ford Madox Hueffer – Romance
Florence Converse – Long Will
Grazia Deledda – Elias Portolu
Isabelle Eberhardt – Trimardeur (serialization begins)
John Fox, Jr. – The Little Shepherd of Kingdom Come
Mary E. Wilkins Freeman – The Wind in the Rose Bush
George Gissing – The Private Papers of Henry Ryecroft
Henry James – The Ambassadors
Jack London – The Call of the Wild
John Antoine Nau – Force ennemie
Frank Norris (died 1902) – The Pit
Marmaduke Pickthall – Said the Fisherman
Bram Stoker – The Jewel of Seven Stars
Jules Verne – Travel Scholarships (Bourses de voyage)
Mary Augusta Ward – Lady Rose's Daughter
Émile Zola – Vérité
Jerzy Żuławski – Na Srebrnym Globie (On the Silver Globe, first in the Trylogia Księżycowa – Lunar Trilogy)

Children and young people
L. Frank Baum – The Enchanted Island of Yew
Beatrix Potter
The Tale of Squirrel Nutkin
The Tailor of Gloucester
Herminie Templeton – Darby O'Gill and the Good People (book publication)
Kate Douglas Wiggin – Rebecca of Sunnybrook Farm

Drama
Dusé Mohamed Ali – The Jew's Revenge
Jacinto Benavente – La noche del sábado (Saturday Night)
Haralamb Lecca – Cancer la inimă 
André de Lorde – Le Système du docteur Goudron et du professeur Plume
W. Somerset Maugham – A Man of Honour
René Morax – La Dîme
Ștefan Petică – Frații
Florencio Sánchez – M'hijo el dotor (My son, the doctor)
George Bernard Shaw – Man and Superman (published)
J. M. Synge – In the Shadow of the Glen
Pierre Wolff – The Secret of Polichinelle
Stanisław Wyspiański – Wyzwolenie (Liberation)

Poetry

Giovanni Pascoli – Canti di Castelvecchio
Thomas Traherne (died 1674) – Poetical Works
W. B. Yeats – In the Seven Woods, being poems of the Irish heroic age

Non-fiction
James Allen – As a Man Thinketh
Ada Cambridge – Thirty Years in Australia
E. K. Chambers – The Mediaeval Stage
W. E. B. Du Bois – The Souls of Black Folk
Helena Rutherfurd Ely – A Woman's Hardy Garden
Auguste Escoffier – Le Guide culinaire
Helen Keller – The Story of My Life (book publication)
G. E. Moore – Principia Ethica
John Morley – The Life of Gladstone
Alois Riegl – Der moderne Denkmalkultus, sein Wesen, seine Entstehung (The Modern Cult of Monuments, Its Character and Origin)
W. B. Yeats – Ideas of Good and Evil (essays)

Births
January 10 – E. Arnot Robertson, English novelist and broadcaster (died 1961)
February 11 – Alan Paton, South African novelist and activist (died 1988)
February 13 – Georges Simenon, Belgian crime writer (died 1989)
February 17 – Sadegh Hedayat, Iranian-born novelist (suicide 1951)
February 21
Anaïs Nin, French-American novelist and diarist (died 1977)
Raymond Queneau, French poet (died 1976)
February 22 – Morley Callaghan, Canadian writer (died 1990)
February 24
Vladimir Bartol, Slovene author (died 1967)
Irène Némirovsky, Russian-born French novelist (died 1942)
June 8 – Marguerite Yourcenar, Belgian novelist (died 1987)
June 18 – Raymond Radiguet, French author (died 1923)
June 25 – George Orwell, English novelist and journalist (died 1950)
July 10 – John Wyndham, English science fiction writer (died 1969)
September 5 – János Kemény, American-born Transylvanian Hungarian writer (died 1971)
September 9 – Edward Upward, English novelist and short story writer (died 2009)
September 10 – Cyril Connolly, English critic and writer (died 1974)
September 14 – Mart Raud, Estonian poet, playwright and writer (died 1980)
October 17
G. E. Trevelyan, English novelist (died 1941)
Nathanael West, American novelist and screenwriter (died 1940)
October 28 – Evelyn Waugh, English novelist and critic (died 1966)
December 6 (November 23 OS) – Gaito Gazdanov, Russian-born novelist (died 1971)
December 10
Mary Norton, English children's writer (died 1992)
William Plomer (Robert Pagan), South African-born novelist, poet and literary editor (died 1973)
December 13 – Todhunter Ballard, American novelist (died 1980)
December 29 – Sergiu Dan, Romanian novelist and journalist (died 1976)
Uncertain dates – Kathleen Lindsay, prolific English-born romance novelist (died 1973)

Deaths
January 22 – Augustus Hare, English biographer and travel writer (born 1834)
February 8 – Ada Ellen Bayly, English novelist (born 1857)
March 4 – Joseph Henry Shorthouse, English novelist (born 1834)
March 6 – Gaston Paris, French literary critic and scholar (born 1839)
March 8 – Josefina Wettergrund, Swedish writer (born 1830) 
March 9 – Minnie Mary Lee, American author of poems, stories, sketches and novels (born 1825) 
March 14 – Ernest Legouvé, French dramatist (born 1807)
April 28 — Frances Augusta Conant, American journalist (born 1841)
April 29 – Paul Du Chaillu, French American travel writer (born c. 1831)
May 12 – Richard Henry Stoddard, American critic and poet (born 1825)
May 24 – Max O'Rell (Léon Paul Blouet), French journalist (born 1847)
June 12 – Claymoor, Romanian fashion and entertainment critic (peptic ulcer, born c. 1842)
July 11 – W. E. Henley, English poet (tuberculosis, born 1847)
August 31 – William Hastie, Scottish theologian (born 1842)
September 1 – Charles Bernard Renouvier, French philosopher (born 1815)
October 4 – Otto Weininger, Austrian philosopher (suicide, born 1880)
November 1 – Theodor Mommsen, German classical scholar and historian (born 1817)
November 11 — Lavilla Esther Allen, American author (born 1834)
November 19 – Hugh Stowell Scott (Henry Seton Merriman), English novelist (born 1862)
December 10 – Constantin Dobrescu-Argeș, Romanian journalist, playwright and peasant activist (paralysis, born 1856)
December 28 – George Gissing, English novelist (emphysema, born 1857)

Awards
Prix Goncourt: John Antoine Nau for Force ennemie
Nobel Prize for Literature: Bjørnstjerne Bjørnson

References

 
Years of the 20th century in literature